Fancy You is the seventh extended play by the South Korean girl group Twice. It was released by JYP Entertainment on April 22, 2019, and features the lead single "Fancy". The group embarked on a world tour in support of the EP.

Consisting of six tracks heavily featuring pop dance and hip hop, members Momo, Jihyo, Sana, and Chaeyoung participated in the album as songwriters. Marking a change in musical concept for the group, the EP received generally favorable reviews from music critics. The EP also welcomed commercial success, holding the record for having the highest first-week sales for a Korean girl group album until it was surpassed by Twice's succeeding release, Feel Special.

Background 
On April 8, 2019, Twice revealed the first group teasers for their upcoming mini-album, announcing that it was titled Fancy You with the lead single "Fancy", which was slated for a release on April 22, 6PM KST. Simultaneously, the group also announced an upcoming world tour on the same day, with concert dates being confirmed for Seoul, Bangkok, Manila, Singapore, Los Angeles, Mexico City, Newark, Chicago, and Kuala Lumpur. On April 9, the group released individual teaser posters featuring Nayeon, Jeongyeon, and Momo. The credits for the lead single "Fancy" was also revealed, being composed by Black Eyed Pilseung and Jeon Gun. On April 10, individual teaser posters featuring Sana, Jihyo, and Mina were uploaded. A tracklist for the album was also unveiled, revealing six songs in total. On April 11, the final set of individual teaser posters featuring Dahyun, Chaeyoung, and Tzuyu were uploaded by the group. They also revealed the credits for the album's tracklist, showing that Jihyo wrote the lyrics for “Girls Like Us,” Momo co-wrote lyrics for “Hot,” Sana co-wrote lyrics for “Turn It Up,” and Chaeyoung co-wrote lyrics for “Strawberry.”

On April 12, Twice uploaded a new group teaser photo, and on the following day, a new set of individual teaser images for all nine members were released. On April 14, the group released a teaser video which featured a part of the music video set. On April 15, a "prelude" teaser video starring Jeongyeon was uploaded by the group. A third set of group teaser photos were uploaded on April 16. On April 18, Twice revealed photo cards featuring Jihyo and Chaeyoung, and a CD with a photo cover featuring Momo. On the same day, the group participated in an interview with Allure magazine detailing more about their upcoming comeback following their pictorial.<ref>{{Cite web|date=April 18, 2019|title="Bold Transformation" Twice, Teaser for New Song'FANCYVisual Grand Feast'|url=https://www.newsen.com/news_view.php?uid=201904180801240410|url-status=live|website=Newsen|access-date=February 25, 2021|archive-date=June 13, 2021|archive-url=https://web.archive.org/web/20210613145724/https://www.newsen.com/news_view.php?uid=201904180801240410}}</ref> On April 19, the group uploaded a choreography teaser on YouTube. They then uploaded a highlight medley for the album on April 20. On April 21, they unveiled a behind-the-scenes look at their photo shoot for the album. The final teaser for the group's upcoming music video release was uploaded on April 22, revealing the post-hook portion of "Fancy".Fancy You and its corresponding title track was officially released on April 22, 6PM KST. The group held a live showcase at the Yes24 Live Hall in Gwangjang-dong, Seoul.

 Composition Fancy You consists of six tracks which heavily features the pop dance and hip hop genres. The songs featured in the album all have a common theme about boldly revealing one's romantic affections. The title track "Fancy" is described as a "bouncing electro-pop track" that retains Twice's retro-inspired sonic base while featuring synth music. "Stuck In My Head" is classified as a hip hop track. "Girls Like Us" is seen as a summer track which lyrically encourages women to "live out their best lives". "Hot" is considered to be a pop song featuring distinct guitar riffs, lyrically describing the confidence of a woman who "everyone turns to look at her beauty and is mesmerized by her charisma." "Turn It Up" is a pop-dance track which talks about how one attempts to catch the attention of their romantic interest. The EP's closing track, "Strawberry", is described as a "soft pop" track wherein the members figuratively compare themselves to a "sweet strawberry with freckles".

Promotion
Twice held a live broadcast on Naver V Live to commemorate their comeback, where they also performed the full choreography for the album's title track "Fancy" for the first time. The group also promoted "Fancy" on several music programs in South Korea including M Countdown, Music Bank, Show! Music Core, Inkigayo and Show Champion, from April 25 until May 1, respectively.

Twice appeared on a two-episode special of JTBC's Idol Room on April 23 and 30. In support of their Fancy You album, the group embarked on a world tour beginning May 2019 titled "Twicelights", visiting Seoul, Bangkok, Singapore, Los Angeles, and Manila, among other cities.

 Critical reception Billboard magazine included Fancy You in its "25 Greatest K-Pop Albums of the 2010s: Staff List" decade-ender list, ranking at number 24. Writer Joshua Calixto described the EP as "a stylistic quantum leap from anything they’d done before, with heavier, darker undercurrents brought by producers like Charli XCX, MNEK, and K-pop superproducer Black Eyed Pilseung." He further compared the track "Strawberry" to both the attitude emulated by singer Ariana Grande and the simplicity of Selena Gomez's "Bad Liar", while also stating "Girls Like Us" and "Fancy" to be highlights. Overall, Calixto described Fancy You to be sonically different but still retaining Twice's notable features. Chase McMullen of The 405 magazine left a positive review for the album, giving it a rating of 8 out of 10 points. McMullen writes that Twice delivered an EP that is "dependable track after track", calling the album "another joyous, irresistible addition to an already impressive discography." Roxanne Wilson from The Kraze included the album in its April 2019 monthly column as Favorite Album, with Wilson praising the EP's production, stating that the "cohesive composition of the album in general makes it so that the first listen flows together perfectly."

In a more negative review, Cho Ji-hyun of IZM gave a 2 out of 5 rating for Fancy You, noting that the group's attempt to make their music style more mature was unsuccessful with the release of their EP. While he praised some aspects of song productions, Cho stated that rather than changing music styles completely,  the group should have opted for a "skillful digestion" of the members' capabilities.

 Commercial performance 
With the release of Fancy You, Twice became the first Korean girl group to surpass first week album sales of over 150,000 copies sold as recorded by Hanteo Chart, with the EP recording 151,051 copies sold in its first week. With this, Twice reached an accumulative number of 3.75 million albums sold in South Korea. Fancy You held the record for highest first-week Korean girl group album sales until it was surpassed by Twice's succeeding EP release later in 2019, Feel Special. The album also debuted at number 2 on the Weekly Gaon Album Chart, while reaching a peak position atop Japan's Weekly Oricon Albums Chart. Fancy You'' debuted at number 4 on the Billboard World Albums chart, garnering 1,000 copies sold in its first week, becoming their best one-week sales record in the US. This marks Twice's ninth Top 10 entry on World Albums. It then debuted at number two on the Monthly Gaon Album Chart for the month of April, recording 328,477 copies sold. In June, the album received a Platinum certification from Gaon for reaching sales of over 250,000 copies. The album was certified 2× Platinum in November 2022.

Track listing
Adapted from the group's official website.

Charts

Weekly charts

Year-end charts

Certifications

Accolades

See also
List of certified albums in South Korea

References

2019 EPs
Korean-language EPs
Twice (group) EPs
IRiver EPs
Albums produced by MNEK